The 2014–15 Louisiana Tech Lady Techsters basketball team represented the Louisiana Tech University during the 2014–15 NCAA Division I women's basketball season. The Lady Techsters, led by first year head coach Tyler Summitt, played their home games at the Thomas Assembly Center and were members of Conference USA. They finished the season 16–15, 10–8 in C-USA play to finish in a tie for seventh place. They advanced to the quarterfinals of the C-USA women's tournament where they lost to Middle Tennessee State University.

Roster

Schedule

|-
!colspan=9 style="background:#75B2DD; color:#FF0000;"| Exhibition

|-
!colspan=9 style="background:#75B2DD; color:#FF0000;"| Regular season

|-
!colspan=9 style="background:#75B2DD; color:#FF0000;"| C-USA Tournament

See also
2014–15 Louisiana Tech Bulldogs basketball team

References

Louisiana Tech Lady Techsters basketball seasons
Louisiana Tech
Louis
Louis